Lavere "Buster" Harding (March 19, 1917 – November 14, 1965) was a Canadian-born American jazz pianist, composer and arranger.

Early life
Born to Benjamin "Ben" and Ada (née Shreve) Harding in North Buxton, Ontario, Harding was raised in Cleveland, Ohio, where as a teenager he started on his own band.

Later life and career
In 1939, Harding went to work for the Teddy Wilson big band, and then in the early 1940s went to work for the Coleman Hawkins band, and later Cab Calloway. He became a freelance arranger and worked with Benny Goodman, Artie Shaw, Roy Eldridge, Dizzy Gillespie, and Count Basie, among others.

In 1949, he was the musical director for Billie Holiday recording sessions. In the early 1960s, Harding played with Jonah Jones, though he was known primarily as an arranger and composer. Harding did not record as a leader. He died on November 14, 1965, in New York City.

Select discography
With Count Basie
The Count! (Clef, 1952 [1955]) - as arranger
Basie (Clef, 1954) - as arranger
The Story of Jazz (Philips Records)
Basie Ball (Philips Records)
Sounds of Jazz (Fontana Records)
One O'Clock Jump (Columbia Records)

With Roy Eldridge
All the Cats Join In (MCA Records)

With Dizzy Gillespie
The Big Band Sound of Dizzy Gillespie (Verve Records)
Dizzy Gillespie: Best of Small Groups (Verve Records)
Dizzy and Strings (Norgan Records, 1954) also released as Diz Big Band (Verve Records) - as arranger
Jazz Spectrum Vol. 11: Dizzy Gillespie (Metro Records)

With Billie Holiday
Broadcast Performances, Vol. 1: Radio And TV Broadcasts (1949-52) (ESP Disk)
Broadcast Performances, Vol. 2: Radio And TV Broadcasts (1953-56) (ESP Disk)

References

1917 births
1965 deaths
Swing pianists
Swing arrangers
American jazz pianists
American male pianists
American jazz composers
American male jazz composers
Black Canadian musicians
Canadian jazz pianists
Canadian jazz composers
20th-century American composers
20th-century Canadian pianists
20th-century American pianists
Musicians from Cleveland
Jazz musicians from Ohio
20th-century American male musicians
20th-century jazz composers